The 1968–69 Liga Española de Baloncesto season was the 13th season of the Liga Española de Baloncesto and was played between 23 November 1968 and 20 April 1969. The season ended with Real Madrid winning their 11th title.

Overview before the season
12 teams joined the league, including three promoted from the 1967–68 Segunda División.

Promoted from 1967–68 Segunda División
San José Irpen
Manresa Kan's
Bosco Revoltosa

Teams and locations
<onlyinclude>

Regular season

League table

Relegation playoffs

|}

Statistics leaders

Points

References

ACB.com 
Linguasport 
FEB 

Liga Española de Baloncesto (1957–1983) seasons
   
Spanish